Three Faces East is a 1926 American silent drama film directed by Rupert Julian and starring Jetta Goudal and Clive Brook. It is based on a popular 1918 Broadway play by Anthony Paul Kelly about spies during World War I. It was remade under same title as a sound film in 1930, and in 1940 under the title British Intelligence starring Boris Karloff. The story's action takes place in France and Great Britain.

Plot
As described in a film magazine review, while a German prisoner, British aviator Frank Bennett is nursed back to health by Fraulein Marks, who is really Helen Hawtree of the British Intelligence Service. She reaches England and is sent to the Bennett house to watch for Bolke, a German spy, who turns up as the servant Valdar. Helen falls in love with him but remains true to her country. They go to a cellar that is equipped with a radio, Frank arrives and during a fight Boelke is shot. After the war, Frank looks forward to a happy future with Helen. A highlight of the film is an attack on London by German Zeppelin airships and the British defensive anti-aircraft fire.

Cast

Preservation
This film is listed as surviving at the Centre national du cinéma et de l'image animée archives in Bois d'Arcy, France.

See also
 Three Faces East (1930)
 British Intelligence (1940)

References

External links

 
 
 Lobby poster

1926 films
1920s spy drama films
American spy drama films
American silent feature films
American films based on plays
Films directed by Rupert Julian
American black-and-white films
Producers Distributing Corporation films
Films set in London
1926 drama films
1920s American films
Silent American drama films